The 2013 New Zealand rugby league tour of Great Britain and France was a tour by the New Zealand national rugby league team to compete at the 2013 Rugby League World Cup. New Zealand won Pool B of the tournament as well as their quarter and semi-finals, before losing to Australia 2-34 in the World Cup final.

New Zealand were the defending World Cup champions after winning the 2008 Rugby League World Cup.

Background
Alongside Australia and France, New Zealand have competed at all thirteen World Cups. New Zealand finished runner up in 1988 and 2000 before winning the 2008 World Cup by defeating Australia 34-20 in the final.

After the 2008 tournament, international football focused on three Four Nations tournaments held between 2009 and 2011. New Zealand won the 2010 tournament but finished third in 2009 and 2011. New Zealand also lost four Anzac Test matches to Australia in this period and two trans-Tasman test matches.

Build up
New Zealand held a pre-season training camp in Sydney in January 2013 to start their World Cup build up. The camp involved between 30 and 40 players and was funded by Sport New Zealand.

In February, Benji Marshall was stripped of the captaincy and replaced with Simon Mannering. Marshall had been the Kiwis captain since 2009 but his form had been poor at international level as captain.

The New Zealand Kiwis played the annual ANZAC test against Australia at Canberra Stadium on 19 April, losing 12-32. The squad was Josh Hoffman, Sam Perrett, Shaun Kenny-Dowall, Dean Whare, Jason Nightingale, Kieran Foran (c), Shaun Johnson, Jesse Bromwich, Issac Luke, Jared Waerea-Hargreaves, Frank Pritchard, Kevin Proctor, Alex Glenn, Bench: Elijah Taylor, Sam McKendry, Ben Matulino, Tohu Harris. Captain Simon Mannering was ruled out on the day of the test, with Glenn replacing him in the starting side and Harris joining the bench. Roger Tuivasa-Sheck was the reserve.

Benji Marshall signed for rugby union franchise the Blues in August, making him unavailable for the Kiwis World Cup squad. Sonny Bill Williams also declared himself unavailable for the World Cup.

During the 2013 NRL Grand Final, Shaun Kenny-Dowall was injured and was subsequently ruled out of the World Cup.

Following the naming of the squad, Sonny Bill Williams declared that he would be available for the tournament. After deliberation, he was added to the squad at the expense of Tohu Harris. Harris declined the offer to travel with the squad as a travelling reserve.

The Kiwis assembled in Narrabeen, Sydney for a two-day training camp before flying to the United Kingdom.

Staff
Head Coach: Stephen Kearney
Assistant Coach: Tony Iro

The national selectors were Richie Barnett, Ivan Cleary, Stephen Kearney and Tawera Nikau, with Tony Iro serving as the convenor of selectors.

Squad

Train-on squad
An initial training squad was named on 11 September 2015 and added to as teams were eliminated from the NRL finals.

Brisbane Broncos: Alex Glenn, Josh Hoffman

Canterbury-Bankstown Bulldogs: Greg Eastwood, Krisnan Inu, Sam Kasiano, Sam Perrett, Frank Pritchard

Melbourne Storm: Jesse Bromwich, Tohu Harris, Kevin Proctor

North Queensland Cowboys: Jason Taumalolo, Antonio Winterstein

St George Illawarra Dragons: Bronson Harrison, Jason Nightingale

Penrith Panthers: Lewis Brown, Sam McKendry, Dean Whare

New Zealand Warriors: Shaun Johnson, Thomas Leuluai, Kevin Locke, Simon Mannering, Ben Matulino, Sam Rapira, Elijah Taylor, Manu Vatuvei

Wests Tigers: Adam Blair, Tim Simona

Unavailable: Gerard Beale, Benji Marshall

Final squad

Fixtures

Warm up match

New Zealand played a warm up match against the Cook Islands on 20 October in Doncaster. The match was played with unlimited interchange and as a result was not regarded as a test match. It was Simon Mannering's first match as Kiwis captain. The halftime score was 24-0.

1 Josh Hoffman, 2 Jason Nightingale, 3 Krisnan Inu, 4 Dean Whare, 5 Manu Vatuvei, 6 Kieran Foran, 7 Shaun Johnson, 8 Jesse Bromwich, 9 Issac Luke, 10 Sam Kasiano, 11 Frank Pritchard, 12 Simon Mannering (c), 13 Elijah Taylor. Interchange: 14 Greg Eastwood, 15 Ben Matulino, 16 Alex Glenn, 17 Kevin Locke, 18 Bryson Goodwin, 19 Roger Tuivasa-Sheck

World Cup Pool B

Samoa

France

Papua New Guinea

The 18,180 attendance was higher than all but one of Leeds Rhinos' home Super League attendances for 2013.

Quarter-final

Semi-final
New Zealand won the match when Shaun Johnson scored a try with 20 seconds remaining.

Touch Judges:
James Child (England)
Grant Atkins (Australia)
Video Referee:
Ashley Klein (Australia)

Final

Touch Judges:
James Child (England)
Grant Atkins (Australia)
Video Referee:
Ashley Klein (Australia)

Aftermath
During the tournament several players were accused of mixing sleeping pills with energy drinks to help their recovery. While not illegal, concerns were raised by New Zealand support staff. Sonny Bill Williams and Kieran Foran were named as two of the players involved. The All Blacks had a similar problem at the 2011 Rugby World Cup. The National Rugby League set up a taskforce in response to the issue, with NZRL represented by high performance manager Tony Iro.

The NZRL's player of the year was Kieran Foran.

Following a post campaign review, the NZRL re-appointed Stephen Kearney for two more years, with an option to renew the contract until the 2017 Rugby League World Cup.

References

2013
Great Britain and France
2013
2013
2013 Rugby League World Cup